Jangal Khurd is a village in Sumerpur block of Unnao district, Uttar Pradesh, India. As of 2011, its population is 446, in 93 households, and it has one primary school and no healthcare facilities.

The 1961 census recorded Jangal Khurd as comprising 1 hamlet, with a total population of 225 (129 male and 96 female), in 40 households and 40 physical houses. The area of the village was given as 189 acres.

References

Villages in Unnao district